R565 road may refer to:
 R565 road (Ireland)
 R565 road (South Africa)